Muricy Ramalho (born 30 November 1955) is a Brazilian former football coach and player who is the current sporting director of São Paulo.

During his playing career, he was as an attacking midfielder. His most recent position was as manager of Flamengo, until health issues forced him to step down in 2017. Between 2006 and 2008, Ramalho led São Paulo to three consecutive national championships. In 2010, he also led Fluminense to the title. On July 23, 2010, it was reported that he had been offered the post of the coach of the Brazil national team, to replace the sacked Dunga. His team at the time, however, Fluminense, refused to release him for the job.

Ramalho is also known by his paulistano accent, usually speaking expressions from this dialect.

Playing career
During his playing career in the 1970s, Ramalho was a midfielder with São Paulo. Between 1973 and 1978, he played 177 games for the club, scoring 26 goals. Later in his career, he played in Mexico, being almost unknown in Brazil during that time. He was not called up for the 1978 World Cup due to a knee injury. After retiring, he started his career as a head coach.

Head coaching career
Ramalho started his head coaching career as the head coach of Mexican club Puebla. He managed several clubs, including São Paulo, his former club as a player, and Internacional.

"Expressinho"
Ramalho was the São Paulo youth squad head coach between 1994 and 1996. He was the manager of the São Paulo team that won the Copa CONMEBOL in 1994. That team was formed from reserve and youth players, receiving the nickname "Expressinho". Despite the technical limitations of the team, São Paulo won the cup, defeating Peñarol of Uruguay in the final. Players such as Denílson and Rogério Ceni were discovered by Ramalho during the competition.

2006–2009
After working for Internacional, including taking them to runners-up in the Campeonato Brasileiro de 2005, on January 3, 2006, ten years later he came back to manage São Paulo, signing a one-year contract. He was the head coach of São Paulo for three years, winning the Série A three times in a row. His methods and the playing style of his team did not win universal admiration, however. After a poor start in the league and being eliminated from the Libertadores Cup in 2009 to Cruzeiro, his fourth consecutive elimination from the tournament, the board fired him.

2009
After almost a month of negotiations, Ramalho stated his desire to direct the team of Palmeiras, signing a contract on July 22, 2009.

2010
After six months as Palmeiras' head coach, Ramalho was fired on February 18, 2010, after a 1–4 defeat against São Caetano. On April 25, he was announced as the new head coach of Fluminense, his second time working in Rio de Janeiro. On July 23, he was appointed as head coach of the Brazil national team, but was not released by the Rio de Janeiro-based team, prompting the Brazil Football Confederation to choose Mano Menezes instead.

By the end of the season, Ramalho has led Fluminense to its third national championship, after 1970 and 1984.

2011
On April 6, 2011, it was announced that Ramalho would take charge of Santos until the end of the 2011 season. He led Santos to the 2011 Campeonato Paulista title and later to the Copa Libertadores title. Ramalho renewed his contract until December 2013.

2013
After losing the State Championship, and after having star player Neymar sold to Barcelona, Ramalho, on 31 May, was dismissed by club. The intention of Santos was to start a reformulation. Ramalho signed in April 2011, and, since then, he won two State Championships, one Recopa Sudamericana, and the most important, 2011 Copa Libertadores, when Santos beat Uruguayan side Peñarol in the final.

Return to São Paulo
On September 9, 2013, after losing to Coritiba 2–0, game that kept São Paulo in relegation zone of Série A, the directors of the club sacked Paulo Autuori, signing Ramalho as his replacement. In São Paulo's official website, a report praised Autuori's work and welcomed the arrival of Ramalho, who had previously won three Brazilian leagues titles with the club. He was presented on September 10, 2013, praised by João Paulo de Jesus Lopes, vice-president of the club. Ramalho stated, "We are on a phase that we cannot stay talking to players. We must have to get the victories. Each one has his own way to work. Let's keep our problems outside." Ramalho's first game in charge was a 1–0 victory over Ponte Preta. During the match, São Paulo fans at the Morumbi Stadium shouted "É, Muricy" ("Yeah, Muricy") in satisfaction of Ramalho's return.

On November 2, 2013, in an interview with Brazilian newspaper O Estado de S. Paulo, Ramalho affirmed the following words:

On December 7, 2013, Ramalho, after a very successful first year ahead of the club, renewed his contract with São Paulo for two more seasons. Upon signing, he stated, "I am happy to stay, because here is my home and the affection the supporters show for me motivates me even further. I am very happy for we have had an excellent year."

On April 6, 2015, Ramalho stepped down as coach of São Paulo due to illness; he had been hospitalized in January with a digestive disease.

Flamengo
Ramalho was appointed head coach of Flamengo in early 2016, but was forced to resign due to poor health in May of that year. He was replaced by Flamengo U-20 coach Zé Ricardo.

Controversies
While with Santos, in December 2011, at the final of the 2011 FIFA Club World Cup against Barcelona, and after his team lost 4–0, Ramalho praised Barça manager Pep Guardiola's work, though stated that it was simple for him since he had the financial clout to sign any player in the world. Ramalho said that European coaches would only score top marks in his book once they had the same success when coaching a Brazilian side. "Only when they win trophies here [Brazil] they will be the best coaches in the world." He was referring to the lack of funding, lack of good players – allegedly who all play in Europe – and the ever-growing pressure to perform.

In February 2013, the media reported that Ramalho engaged in a verbal exchange with Neymar and Joey Barton. The latter had been little impressed by Neymar's performances in a friendly match in London, later stating, "I would not pay a lot of money to sign him." After journalists' insistence on a comment, Ramalho responded that although he meant no disrespect, he did not know who Barton was.

In May 2013, Ramalho spoke about a fake profile on the social network Facebook that has a lot of friends. According to the coach, the creator of profile "must be an idiot that doesn't have anything to do. He should do something for himself, not for someone else".

In July 2013, two months after leaving Santos, Ramalho said that if he was to work in Europe, he would have been given a 30-year contract and would have a statue dedicated to him afterwards because even "[Arsène] Wenger can coach Arsenal for almost 15 years having had so little success". Also in July 2013, in a new interview, Ramalho spoke about players he had previously coached. According to the coach, Müller, currently a football pundit, was a "difficult player, it was complicated. It was really very hard. He was a excellent player, but ain't easy to work with him". Meanwhile, on the defender Breno, whom Ramalho coached with at São Paulo, he stated, "He thought he was [Franz] Beckenbauer."

Ramalho also is known for his roughness and lack of patience with bad journalists and those who work to create a controversy where one does not exist.
 
In April 2014, Ramalho was praised by one journalist in reference to his past as a football player. Ramalho said he was ten times better than the present players of São Paulo. To this day, fans bring flags with his face and name to Estádio do Morumbi. "I played at least ten times better. But they haven't seen it, and I don't talk about it because it is a thing from the past. In this team, I would pick up my number 8 jersey and the coach would only have to think about the other players," he added.

Career statistics

Head coach

Head coaching honors
São Paulo
 Campeonato Brasileiro Série A (3): 2006, 2007, 2008
 Copa CONMEBOL: 1994
 Copa Masters CONMEBOL: 1996

Shanghai Shenhua
 Cup of China: 1998

Náutico
 Campeonato Pernambucano (2): 2001, 2002

Internacional
 Campeonato Gaúcho: 2003, 2005
 Campeonato Brasileiro Série A runner-up: 2005

São Caetano
 Campeonato Paulista: 2004

Fluminense
 Campeonato Brasileiro Série A: 2010

Santos
 Copa Libertadores: 2011
 Recopa Sudamericana: 2012
 Campeonato Paulista (2): 2011, 2012

References

1955 births
Living people
Brazilian expatriate footballers
Brazilian footballers
Association football midfielders
Brazilian people of Portuguese descent
Brazilian football managers
Expatriate football managers in China
Campeonato Brasileiro Série A managers
Liga MX players
São Paulo FC players
Club Puebla players
America Football Club (RJ) players
Club Puebla managers
São Paulo FC managers
Guarani FC managers
Shanghai Shenhua F.C. managers
Ituano FC managers
Botafogo Futebol Clube (SP) managers
Associação Atlética Portuguesa (Santos) managers
Santa Cruz Futebol Clube managers
Clube Náutico Capibaribe managers
Figueirense FC managers
Sport Club Internacional managers
Associação Desportiva São Caetano managers
Sociedade Esportiva Palmeiras managers
Santos FC managers
CR Flamengo managers
Footballers from São Paulo
São Paulo FC non-playing staff